Killer cell immunoglobulin-like receptor 2DL4 is a protein that in humans is encoded by the KIR2DL4 gene.

Function 

Killer cell immunoglobulin-like receptors (KIRs) are transmembrane glycoproteins expressed by natural killer cells and subsets of CD8+ T cells. The KIR genes are polymorphic and highly homologous and they are found in a cluster on chromosome 19q13.4 within the 1 Mb leukocyte receptor complex (LRC). The gene content of the KIR gene cluster varies among haplotypes, although several "framework" genes are found in all haplotypes (KIR3DL3, KIR3DP1, KIR2DL4, KIR3DL2). The KIR proteins are classified by the number of extracellular immunoglobulin domains (2D or 3D) and by whether they have a long (L) or short (S) cytoplasmic domain. KIR proteins with the long cytoplasmic domain transduce inhibitory signals upon ligand binding via an immune tyrosine-based inhibitory motif (ITIM), while KIR proteins with the short cytoplasmic domain lack the ITIM motif and instead associate with the TYRO protein tyrosine kinase binding protein to transduce activating signals. The ligands for several KIR proteins are subsets of HLA class I molecules; thus, KIR proteins are thought to play an important role in regulation of the immune response. This gene is one of the "framework" loci that is present on all haplotypes. Alternative splicing results in multiple transcript variants.

The only so far reported ligand of KIR2DL4 is the non-classical HLA class 1 gene HLA-G, leading to the inhibition of the cytolytic NK cell function.

See also 
 Cluster of differentiation

References

Further reading

External links 
 PDBe-KB provides an overview of all the structure information available in the PDB for Human Killer cell immunoglobulin-like receptor 2DL4 (KIR2DL4)

Clusters of differentiation
Immunoglobulin superfamily